Mak Pak Shee was a Singaporean politician.

Career
An African Chinese with Cantonese ancestry, Mak was the leader of the Singapore-based Labour Party. He left the party in August 1950. When he was in the Cabinet, he held the position of Junior Minister. In his book One Man's View of the World (2013), Singapore's first Prime Minister Lee Kuan Yew described Mak as a "fixer – somebody who facilitated the fulfilment of favours for a fee".

Lawsuits
In July 1948, Mak was meted a fine of S$250 for inappropriately including the honorifics "MB, BS" in his name.

Personal life
Mak had at least three sons. His third son, Mak Kok Hoe, died aged eight in February 1957 and was buried at a Muslim graveyard.

References

Members of the Cabinet of Singapore
Singaporean people of Cantonese descent
Singaporean people of Chinese descent
Singaporean people of Indian descent
Labour Front politicians
Year of birth missing